Taszár Air Base  is a military air base located near Taszár, Somogy County, Hungary.

It became the primary staging post for peacekeeping forces coming and going into the Balkans in December of 1995 becoming NATO's first military base in former Warsaw Pact territory 
During two years of Operations Joint Endeavor and Joint Guard, Taszar can claim Europe's largest airlift mission since World War II. Normally, three or four C-130s make daily two-hour hops to Taszar from Ramstein AB, Germany. 
But during rotation surges, activity jumps to 20 aircraft - including jumbo commercial charters - that deliver some 4,000 US replacement peacekeepers.

In 1999 the airbase was used by the United States Marine Corps as a base for aircraft supporting Operation Allied Force in Kosovo.  During Operation Joint Forge (1998-2004) the National Support Element (NSE) of the U.S. Army (consisting of approximately 250 U.S. Army personnel) was located at the airbase.  In late 2000 the NSE's designation was changed to United States Army Support Element Tasar (USASET).

It was reportedly 'mothballed' in 2001, but the United States then used it to train the Free Iraqi Forces before March 2003. Then Major General David Barno said the training programme had been ended, with the departure of the second group of Free Iraqi Forces, on April 1, 2003.

, it is reported "disused".

Facilities

References

David Oliver (ed.), 'East European Air Power,' No.3 in the AFM Airpower Series, Air Forces Monthly/Key Publishing, 1991(?)

External links
 Eastern Wings, 31st Kapos Tactical Fighter Regiment - Taszar, 1996
 
 
 https://www.globalsecurity.org/military/facility/taszar.htm

Buildings and structures in Somogy County
Military airbases of Hungary
Military installations of the United States in Hungary
Military installations closed in 2004